The 2010 American Indoor Football Association season is the league's sixth overall season, and the last before its split and cessation of operations.  The regular season began on Saturday, March 6 and ended on Sunday, July 4.  The league champion was decided on Sunday, July 25 in the AIFA Championship Bowl IV, where the Baltimore Mariners completed a perfect season by beating the Wyoming Cavalry.  Prior to the regular season, the league held its annual exhibition game in Richmond, Virginia called the AIFA Kickoff Classic.

AIFA Kickoff Classic

Located at the Richmond Coliseum in Richmond, Virginia on Saturday, January 23

Standings

 Green indicates clinched playoff berth
 Purple indicates division champion
 Grey indicates best league record

Playoffs

References

External links
 2010 AIFA Stats